This is a list which includes a photographic gallery, of some of the remaining ruins of historic significance in Two Guns, a ghost town in Arizona. Two Guns is located in the central part of Arizona on U.S. Route 66 (US 66) in Coconino County between the city of Flagstaff and the town of Winslow. Also included are images of the Apache Death Cave and the Canyon Diablo Bridge which is located across the Canyon Diablo in Two Guns.

Brief history

Early settlers
It has been determined that the greatest Native-American population that the area of Canyon Diablo where Two Guns is located ever had was between 1050 and 1300 A.D.. This determination is the result of the carbon method dating system used on potsherds that were recovered in the area.

The Hopi, Navajos and Apaches are among the tribes who live where Two Guns is located. The Navajos and Apaches often fought each other and used the Diablo Canyon to seek refuge and as a point to launch an attack. Such was the case of the battle that ended in an area of Two Guns which is known as the Apache Death Cave.

The first Europeans to arrive in the area were the Spanish conquistadores. Captain Don Garcia de Cardenas and his party arrived in Arizona, which at the time was part of "New Mexico", in 1540. In 1582, Antonio de Espejo organized a silver prospecting expedition in the area. One of the two parties named the canyon  Diablo Canyon. which is Spanish for Devils Canyon, which of the parties named the canyon is unknown. The area became part of Mexico when Mexico gained its independence from Spain.

The United States fought against Mexico in what is known as the Mexican–American War. The war ended officially when the 1848 Treaty of Guadalupe Hidalgo was signed and forced onto the remnant Mexican government. It specified its major consequence, the Mexican Cession of the northern territories of Alta California and Santa Fe de Nuevo México to the United States.

The first non-Native people to arrive in Two Guns were traders and mountain men who established the Canyon Lodge, a trading post. The traders had a good relationship with the Navajos, however things changed when the U.S. cavalry began to round up the members of the Navajo tribe in 1864. They were imprisoned in Fort Sumner, New Mexico. After being imprisoned for four years they were released and returned to Canyon Diablo where they hid from the military.

Apache Death Cave

The battles between the Navajos and the Apaches were constant. The group of Apache warriors hid in a cave located in Two Guns. In 1878, they attacked a Navajo camp and murdered everyone with the exception of three Navajo girls who were taken as prisoners. The Apaches not only murdered the Navajos, whom they raided, they also looted the area. The Navajos from another camp sent warriors after the Apaches, however they failed in their quest to find them. When the Apaches attacked another Navajo camp, the Navajo warriors went to Canyon Diablo and saw hot air coming out of the ground.

After taking a closer look, the Navajos discovered that there was a cave and that the raiding Apaches were hiding in it with their horses. The Navajos began to throw burning drywood into the cave. The Apaches then slit the throats of their horses in an attempt to put out the fire after they ran out of water. When the Navajos found out from an Apache who came out of the cave, that the three Navajo girls were murdered, they threw him into the fire and murdered 42 Apaches in the cave. The cave became known as the "Apache Death Cave".

Two Guns

According to Gladwell Richardson, the author of the book "Story of Two Guns and Canyon Diablo, Arizona", during the winter of 1879–80, Billy the Kid and his outlaw gang hid in the ruins of a stone house and corral on the west rim of Canyon Diablo, across from Two Guns.

Various homesteaders and pioneers staked claims to the area. In 1912, the National Old Trails Road, also known as the "Ocean-to-Ocean Highway", was established. It became part of the National Auto Trail system in the United States and stretched from Baltimore, Maryland to California. The road ran through Canyon Lodge (Two Guns).

In 1914, Arizona State engineer Lamar Cobb selected and surveyed the Two Guns location for the construction of a bridge across Canyon Diablo. Thomas Haddock of Williams, Arizona was granted the contract to build the bridge. He used concrete and reinforcing steel supplied by the state to erect the bridge. On March 17, 1915, Canyon Diablo Bridge opened to traffic. The bridge was part of the National Old Trails Road.

In the 1920s, Earle and Louise Cundiff purchased at least up to 320 acres of the land. The Cundiff's established a gas station and eatery at Canyon Lodge which became a busy stop for those who traveled to the west coast. Henry "Two Gun" Miller became interested in the possibility of establishing a business in the area and leased some land from the Cundiff's. Miller established a zoo with mountain lions and other desert animals. He also built a store on top of the Apache Death Cave and sold the skeletal remains of the Apaches to tourists. The National Old Trails Road became part of U.S. Route 66 in 1926 and the flourishing town was officially renamed "Two Guns".

On March 3, 1926, Miller got into a dispute with Earle Cundiff over his lease and then shot and killed Cundiff. Miller did not go to prison because he was acquitted of murder during his trial. When Miller returned to Two Guns he was mauled by two mountain lions and was bitten by a poisonous gila dragon and became ill. He soon left Two Guns and never returned.

The decline of Two Guns

Louise Cundiff and together with her new husband, Phillip Hersch, had to rebuild Two Guns because Route 66 was rerouted. After I-40 bypassed Two Guns, the town's fate, like many other popular Route 66 stops, was that of abandonment by traveling motorists. In 1938, the Canyon Diablo Bridge was closed and replaced by the Interstate 40 bridge.

In the 1950s, many attempts were made to bring the town back to life, but they all failed. A last attempt to revitalize the town was made in 1960. A restaurant, gift shop, gas station, motel and shower/restroom house were built. The final attempt failed and the town was abandoned for good in 1971.

What remains of Two Guns are the ruins of the original stone houses, the Apache Death Cave, the ruins of the buildings built in the final attempt to revive the town and the Canyon Diablo Bridge which was added to the National Register of Historic Places on November 30, 1988, reference #88001664.

Structures pictured
 Early stone houses of Two Guns
 The Apache Death Cave
 The Canyon Diablo Bridge
 The Round house/Tower which in the 1930s served as a Texaco gas station
 Ruins of the buildings in Two Guns built in the 1960s

Historic structures, cave and bridge
The following are the images of the ruin in Two Guns, the Apache Death Cave and the Canyon Diablo Bridge.

{{Gallery
|title=Canyon Diablo Bridge
|width=180px
|height=200px
|align=center
|lines=4
|File:Two Guns-Canyon Diablo Bridge-1915-1-A.jpg|The Canyon Diablo Bridge.
|File:Two Guns-Canyon Diablo Bridge-1915-1-C.jpg|Different view of the Canyon Diablo Bridge.
|File:Two Guns-Canyon Diablo Bridge-1915-1-E.jpg|Close-up view of the Canyon Diablo Bridge.
|File:Two Guns-Canyon Diablo Bridge-1915-2.jpg|Historic Route 66 over the Canyon Diablo Bridge'.

}}

Further reading
 Heatwole, Thelma (1981). Ghost Towns and Historical Haunts in Arizona''; Phoenix: Golden West Publishers .

See also

 Two Guns, Arizona
 Gillett, Arizona
 Twin Arrows, Arizona
 Vulture City, Arizona
 National Register of Historic Places listings in Arizona
 National Register of Historic Places listings in Coconino County, Arizona

References

Two Guns
Ghost towns in Arizona